Damien Brown (born 12 January 1975) is an Australian retired professional footballer.

Born in Gosford, Brown played youth football with The Entrance and Central Coast, before making his senior debut for The Entrance in 1992. He later spent several seasons in the National Soccer League before joining hometown side Central Coast Mariners for the first three seasons of the A-League.

Early life
Brown was born in Gosford, on the Central Coast of New South Wales. He attended St Edward's College, East Gosford until 1990. From 1991 to 1992, he attended St Peter's Catholic College, Tuggerah.

Playing career

Early years
Brown first played youth football on the Central Coast for The Entrance, before being selected for Central Coast in 1986. He remained with the club until 1997, with the exception of seasons spent at The Entrance (whilst completing his Higher School Certificate) and Newcastle Breakers in the National Soccer League in 1995–96. He spent the next several years playing for various clubs in the National Soccer League and NSW Super League sides.

Central Coast Mariners
In November 2004, Brown joined newly-formed hometown club Central Coast Mariners to play in the inaugural A-League season. He scored what was his only A-League goal in a 4–1 F3 Derby win over his former club, Newcastle Jets on 31 December 2005. In April 2007, Brown signed a further one-year deal with the Mariners for the 2007–08 season. In early June 2008, Brown announced his retirement from professional football; and that he would be staying with the Mariners in a youth development role.

Brown returned to state football with Lake Macquarie City in the Northern NSW Football State League in 2011, along with fellow former Mariners Andre Gumprecht and Wayne O'Sullivan. The move saw him play against the Mariners in a friendly in September 2011.

In 2012, the "Damien Brown Medal" was created by the Central Coast Men of Football, to be awarded to the best Mariners player each season as voted for by the group's members.

Honours

Club
Blacktown City:
NSW Super League Premiership: 2000
NSW Super League Championship: 2000

Central Coast Mariners:
A-League Premiership: 2007–08
A-League Pre-Season Challenge Cup: 2005

The Entrance:
Central Coast Football Premiership: 2010
Central Coast Football Championship: 2010

Individual
 Central Coast Football Hall of Fame: 2013

See also
List of Central Coast Mariners FC players

References

External links
 
 Oz Football profile

1975 births
Living people
People from Gosford
Australian soccer players
A-League Men players
National Soccer League (Australia) players
Blacktown City FC players
Central Coast Mariners FC players
Parramatta Power players
Lake Macquarie City FC players
Central Coast Mariners FC non-playing staff
Association football midfielders
Newcastle Jets FC players
Newcastle Breakers FC players
People educated at St Peter's Catholic College, Tuggerah
Sportsmen from New South Wales
Soccer players from New South Wales